Leon Charles Jeanne (born 17 November 1980) is a Welsh former professional footballer. He began his career with Queens Park Rangers before joining his hometown team Cardiff City. However, he suffered from drug and alcohol addiction and was given a two-year suspended ban by the Football Association of Wales after testing positive for a class A drug. Continued disciplinary problems eventually led to his release from Cardiff.

Early life
Jeanne was born in Cardiff and grew up in the Llanrumney area of the city. He attended Llanrumney High School.

Career

Football League
A talented winger, Jeanne was spotted at the age of ten by Arsenal scout Eddie Prenderville. He spent time with the London-based club as a schoolboy before joining Queens Park Rangers on a YTS scheme at the age of thirteen. He made his debut in February 1999 against Watford, but problems began to arise nearly as soon as he became a professional when he disappeared for over a week when he was meant to be reporting for Wales under-21 duty. However, manager Gerry Francis revealed that it was not the first time the youngster had gone missing, stating "We've covered up for Leon enough now. This is not a one off." Francis also commented that Jeanne was on his last chance at the club after being arrested for drink-driving the previous year.

He left QPR in 2001 to sign for his hometown club Cardiff City in the hope of ending his disciplinary problems. The transfer was arranged by Jeanne's agent John Fashanu who had worked with Cardiff chairman Sam Hammam at his former club Wimbledon and described how Hammam had been a positive influence over him and hoped that he could do the same for Jeanne. However, just weeks after joining, he tested positive for a class A drug and was handed a two-year suspended sentence by the Football Association of Wales. The FAW also stipulated that Jeanne should undergo an education programme to help him learn to read and write and find a family to live with, eventually moving into the home of former Cardiff player Ronnie Bird.

In January 2002, he was named in the starting line-up for a 3–0 victory over Newtown in the FAW Premier Cup, scoring his side's first goal of the match with a header. However, he was substituted in the second half by manager Alan Cork for "showboating". He was named as an unused substitute for a league match against Wycombe Wanderers in but, less than a month later, Jeanne was admitted to the Priory Hospital in an attempt to overcome an alcohol problem. Cardiff manager Cork stated his belief that Jeanne had a "big problem" with alcohol and that he kept a breathalyzer in his office and had once taken Jeanne to a local Alcoholics Anonymous meeting. In May 2002 Jeanne was selected for random drugs testing and sent his sample away but the results came back only to show that the sample he had submitted was not urine. He refused to provide a second sample which led to Cardiff terminating his contract and he left the club. On the morning of the drugs test, Jeanne had agreed a new contract with the club but this was revoked following the incident.

Non-league
After his release from Cardiff he attempted a comeback with Havant & Waterlooville in a pre-season friendly against League of Wales side Barry Town but was withdrawn from playing after officials at Barry questioned if he was allowed to play at which point it was revealed that he was currently banned from playing football. He was allowed to resume playing a short while later and enjoyed a prosperous spell at Port Talbot Town but yet again he was involved in a scandal. In September 2002 he was arrested, along with two other men, on suspicion of dealing class A drugs. During the court case he revealed that he used to be addicted to cocaine. Eventually he and the other two men were cleared of all charges.

After the case ended he returned to football with Newport County followed by spells at Dinas Powys and Barry Town. After a spell playing for Maesteg Park, Jeanne joined amateur side Carpenters Arms. On 7 July 2009, Jeanne was arrested on suspicion of money-laundering after a police raid on his home.

Jeanne featured in two pre-season friendlies for Conference South side Weston-super-Mare on 9 and 11 July before signing on non-contract terms, making his debut on the opening day of the season in a defeat to Staines Town. However, he was released the following month due to a lack of fitness.

In November 2010, Jeanne left Welsh League side Cardiff Corinthians, and signed for Conference National side Bath City on a non-contract pay-as-you-play basis. Jeanne also signed on for Cinderford Town of the Southern League South & West Division on dual registration and spent the majority of the 2010–11 season with Cinderford.

In June 2011, Jeanne joined Championship side Brighton & Hove Albion for pre-season training in a bid to earn a contract and play football at a high level once more. He started the 2011–12 season playing for Welsh Premier League side Afan Lido but left before the start of the 2012–13 season to join Carmarthen Town.

Honours
Cardiff City
 FAW Premier Cup winner: 2001–02

Personal life

In May 2015 Jeanne was sentenced to 30 months in prison for conspiring to supply cocaine, heroin and cannabis.
He was part of a drug gang operating in Gloucester and surrounding cities and areas selling crack cocaine and heroin. He was responsible for the Cardiff side of the gangs business operation. Judge Ford told him: "You are a great disappointment to many people. You wasted your talent and turned from an honest, athletic man to a common criminal. You've been ruined by drugs. References show you have the capacity for reform."

In June 2017, Jeanne and his 19-year-old son Tremaine were convicted after the latter had an armed fight with another man in Llanrumney the previous November. Jeanne admitted threats and received 180 hours of unpaid work, while his son received eight months in detention for affray and possession of an offensive weapon, concurrent with his three-year sentence for possessing crack cocaine with intent to supply. The third man received six months in prison for affray.

In July 2019, Jeanne was convicted of dangerous driving after damaging another car while fleeing from the police at 100 miles per hour. He was given an eight-month prison sentence suspended for 18 months, and 12 weeks of curfew. In September, a warrant was issued for his arrest due to breaches of curfew.

References

External links

1980 births
Living people
Footballers from Cardiff
Welsh footballers
Wales youth international footballers
Wales under-21 international footballers
Association football midfielders
Queens Park Rangers F.C. players
Cardiff City F.C. players
Newport County A.F.C. players
Port Talbot Town F.C. players
Barry Town United F.C. players
Dinas Powys F.C. players
Merthyr Tydfil F.C. players
Maesteg Park A.F.C. players
Weston-super-Mare A.F.C. players
Bath City F.C. players
Cinderford Town A.F.C. players
Afan Lido F.C. players
Carmarthen Town A.F.C. players
English Football League players
National League (English football) players
Southern Football League players
Cymru Premier players
Doping cases in association football
Welsh sportspeople in doping cases
Welsh drug traffickers
Welsh people convicted of drug offences
Prisoners and detainees of England and Wales
Cardiff Corinthians F.C. players